The Firestone Indy 200 was an Indy Racing League IndyCar Series race held at Nashville Superspeedway in Lebanon, Tennessee.

In 2001, it marked the first American open wheel event in the Nashville area. In later years it was held as a Saturday night race. The 2007 event was postponed until Sunday after a series of rain showers at the track. 

Following the 2008 event, Indy Racing League officials decided to end their association with Nashville Superspeedway. The event was removed from the 2009 schedule, and afterwards the facility shuttered for several years. IndyCar returned to the Nashville area in 2021 with the Music City Grand Prix on a downtown street circuit.

Past winners
As is a Nashville-area racing tradition, the winner wins a hand-made and painted Gibson Les Paul guitar (trophies in short-track racing are traditionally guitars).

2007: Race postponed from Saturday night to Sunday afternoon due to rain.
2008: Race shortened due to rain.

References

External links
champcarstats.com

 
Recurring sporting events established in 2001
Recurring events disestablished in 2008